Sesostris is a 1728 tragedy by the British writer John Sturmy. It is based on the life of the Ancient Egyptian ruler Sesostris.

The original Lincoln's Inn Fields  cast included Anthony Boheme as Omar, Lacy Ryan as Sesostris, William Milward as Phanes and Thomas Chapman as Dion, John Ogden as Ammon, Anne Berriman as Nitocris and Elizabeth Younger as Ariaspe.

References

Bibliography
 Burling, William J. A Checklist of New Plays and Entertainments on the London Stage, 1700-1737. Fairleigh Dickinson Univ Press, 1992.

1728 plays
British plays
West End plays
Tragedy plays
Senusret III